The FIS Ski Flying World Ski Championships 1972, the first ever ski flying world championships took place on 25 March 1972 in Planica, Yugoslavia. A total of 110,000 people has gathered in three days.

Schedule

Competition
On 22 March 1972 hill test was originally scheduled, but hill wasn't ready yet to be used due to warm weather and was canceled. A few training jumps were performed at neighbour Bloudkova velikanka.

On 24 March 1972 first ever ski flying world championships was officially opened with official training in front of 20,000 visitors. Three rounds were on schedule; trial round and two rounds for official training which would be valid as official championships final results if jumping would be impossible due to unpredicted weather conditions over the weekend competition day.

On 25 March 1972 first day of competition was in progress in front of 40,000 people. Walter Steiner was leading after first day and two rounds (155 and 158 metres).

On 26 March 1972 second day of competition was on schedule with crowd over 50,000 people. Competition was canceled after trial round, due to unstable wind. Results from previous day counted as official.

Official training
10:00 AM — 24 March 1972 — Two rounds — chronological order incomplete

Official results
10:00 AM — 25 March 1972 — Two rounds — chronological order incomplete

Medal table

References

External links
 FIS Ski Flying World Championships 1972 results. - accessed 25 November 2009.

FIS Ski Flying World Championships
1972 in ski jumping
1972 in Yugoslav sport
Ski jumping competitions in Yugoslavia
International sports competitions hosted by Yugoslavia
Ski jumping competitions in Slovenia
International sports competitions hosted by Slovenia
March 1972 sports events in Europe
1972 in Slovenia